Laura Lee Wyld, Baroness Wyld (born 13 January 1978) is a British communications specialist and life peer. She served as head of the Prime Minister's Appointments Unit from 2013 to 2016, and has been a Conservative member of the House of Lords since 2017.

Wyld was educated in Newcastle upon Tyne and at Sidney Sussex College, Cambridge, where she read history. She was nominated for a life peerage as part of David Cameron's Resignation Honours in 2016, but the creation of her peerage was set to be delayed until the start of the next parliamentary session. She was created Baroness Wyld, of Gosforth in the City of Newcastle upon Tyne, on 22 June 2017.

References

1978 births
Living people
Conservative Party (UK) life peers
Life peers created by Elizabeth II
Alumni of Sidney Sussex College, Cambridge
British public relations people